King Wuling of Zhao (died 295 BCE, reigned 325 BCE – 299 BCE) reigned in the State of Zhao during the Warring States period of Chinese history. His reign was famous for one important event: the reforms consisting of "Wearing the Hu (styled) Attire and Shooting from Horseback (in battle)" (Simplified Chinese: 胡服骑射, Traditional Chinese: 胡服騎射) He was credited for the implementation of protective outfit during military events and proceedings.

The son of Zhao Suhou (Marquess Su of Zhao, Simplified Chinese: 赵肃侯), King Wuling of Zhao ascended to the throne at 325 BCE, about halfway into the Warring States Period. His reign coincided with the appearance of several other notable figures in the Warring States. He was also the first ruler of Zhao to style himself "king" (王), but later reversed the decision. He would later receive the title as part of his posthumous name.

Rule and reforms
During the early years of his reign, the Kingdom of Zhao was constantly harassed by the Donghu, the Linhu (Simplified and Traditional Chinese: 林胡), the Loufan (Simplified Chinese: 楼烦) and the Beidi, all nomadic animal husbandry tribes. This might have been the inspiration for his later reforms. On another level, Wuling himself had been humbled after a great defeat by Qin. Previously, during 325-323 BC, he, along with the rulers of Han, Wei, Yan and Zhongshan, had declared himself king. However, in 318 BC, Zhao suffered a great defeat in the hands of Qin, causing Wuling to muse that since he did not have the power of a king, he should not use the title.

In 307 BCE, Wuling started his reforms. Mostly military, they concentrated on making the military more suited to fighting battles. Up to that time, Zhao commanders riding on horseback still wore robes and normal court attire. Wuling ordered all commanders, including the whole court and military, to adopt the Hu style of dress: pants, belt, boots, fur caps and fur clothes. He created a cavalry division in the army and trained them not only in the ways of a cavalry charge, but also in horse archery.

While many reformists and officials supported the reforms, seeing it as a way to greatness and power, conservative members of the royal family such as Zhao Wuling's uncle Lord Cheng (Simplified and Traditional Chinese: 公子成) disliked it, claiming that there should not be any "Copying of barbaric clothing and changing of old rules" (Simplified Chinese: 不该 "袭远方之服, 变古之教"). Lord Cheng even went so far as to be absent from court.

Wuling did much to check the opposition. He said, "There is not only one way to rule the world, nor is there any need to copy the old to benefit the country" (Simplified Chinese: "理世不必一道, 便国不必法古") and "Those who use the old to define the new do not achieve change" (Simplified Chinese: "以古制今者, 不达于事之变"). He wore the "barbaric" clothes on court and persuaded others to do the same. He even visited Lord Cheng and gave him a suit of the Hu people's clothing. Finally, Lord Cheng relented, and the controversy stopped.

Wuling's reforms greatly improved the fighting capability of the Zhao military. The same year, the Zhao attacked the state of Zhongshan and took several cities. In 306 BCE the Zhao military launched expeditions into the northern territories. The northern expedition was highly successful: the kings of the Loufan and Linhu surrendered and their territories became administered by a governor of Dai. In the next year, parts of Zhongshan were annexed. In 304 BCE the upper reaches of the Yellow River were invaded and taken from the Hu tribes like the Hezong (Simplified and Traditional Chinese: 河宗氏) and the Xiu (Simplified and Traditional Chinese: 休). In the conquered areas King Wuling created two prefectures in 302 BCE - Yunzhong (Simplified Chinese: 云中) and Jiuyuan. In a little over five years Zhao Wuling had expanded his country to the border with the Yan, the upper reaches of the Yellow River and into the north, and had forced two tribal leaders, the Loufan and Linhu kings, to surrender. King Wuling took control of their armies and added them to his military, creating extra divisions made up entirely of indigenous and hardy nomadic warriors.

Abdication and death

In 299 BCE, Zhao Wuling, perhaps tired out from all he had done and wishing to become more involved with military instead of political affairs, abdicated and gave the throne of Zhao to his younger son, Zhao He (Simplified Chinese: 赵何) who was to become King Huiwen of Zhao (Simplified Chinese: 赵惠文王). He called himself the "Lord Father" (Simplified and Traditional Chinese: 主父), using his new title to visit neighbouring countries, especially the Qin, which he visited secretly. He lived long enough to see the annexation of the Zhongshan by the Zhao in 296 BCE.

In 295 BCE, Wuling's older son Zhao Zhang (Simplified Chinese: 赵章) rebelled against King Huiwen and lost. He escaped to the palace in Shaqiu (Simplified and Traditional Chinese: 沙丘), where Zhao Wuling took pity on him and kept him in his palace.

Prime Minister Lord Cheng, the uncle of Wuling, and his subordinate Lord Fengyang (Simplified Chinese: 奉阳君), also known as Li Yu (Simplified and Traditional Chinese: 李兌) laid siege to the palace, allowing no food or water to be provided to the inhabitants inside. In desperation, King Wuling ordered Zhang to be killed, but still the besiegers did not retreat. Thus, after 100 days, King Wuling starved to death. When the siege was finally lifted, King Wuling's body was already rotting and full of worms, a pitiful ending for such a king.

References

Citations

Bibliography
 Zhanguoshi (History of the Warring Kingdoms), Yang Huan, Commercial Press. 
Records of the Grand Historian, volume 43

Year of birth missing
295 BC deaths
Monarchs who abdicated
Monarchs of Zhao (state)
Zhou dynasty nobility
Deaths by starvation
Zhao (state)
340s BC births
Chinese reformers